Paul McGregor may refer to:

Paul McGregor (rugby league) (born 1967), Australian rugby league footballer
Paul McGregor (footballer) (born 1974), English footballer